Notagonum oxypterum is a species of ground beetle in the subfamily Platyninae. It was described by Louwerens in 1955.

References

Notagonum
Beetles described in 1955